WNAH (1360 AM, "Power Gospel") is a radio station broadcasting a religious format. Licensed to Nashville, Tennessee, United States, the station is currently owned by Hoyt M. Carter, Jr.

References

External links
 

FCC History Cards for WNAH

NAH
NAH
1949 establishments in Tennessee
Radio stations established in 1949